Prior to 1900 the library facilities at Hiram College consisted of small libraries corresponding with each of the student literary societies:  Delphic, Hesperian, and Olive Branch.  Societies usually limited access to their members, and the only common library was the college's depository collection of federal government publications (established in 1874) that was stored in the original Hinsdale Hall.

The Teachout-Cooley Library of Hiram College was erected in 1900 with money given by Abram Teachout.  Built of brick and wood, it had two stories with a three-story tower.  In 1923, a supplemental gift from the Teachout family made possible an addition built to the south of the original building, and joined to it by means of a vestibule.  A Greek portico entrance was added, and the size of the Library was essentially doubled. An observatory with its telescope, a gift of Lathrop Cooley, was a prominent feature of the building until 1939.  The observatory was relocated to its present site on Wakefield Road thanks to the generosity of Ella M. Stephens.

The Library's collections then consisted of those books donated by the literary societies and the depository collection.  These were consolidated by the first Librarian of the college, Emma Ryder.  While a student at Hiram, she was made the librarian of the Olive Branch Society, and did such an excellent job that she was asked to organized the libraries of the other societies.  After she graduated in 1890, she went on to study at the University of Chicago and Syracuse University, before returning to Hiram in 1896. She served as the college's Librarian until 1907, and introduced the Dewey Decimal System to the Library.  She also taught Greek and Latin, was the College Registrar and the House Mother for Miller Hall.

The old building was largely destroyed by fire in February 1939.  In addition to thousands of books, also lost were a major portion of the files and records of Professor John S. Kenyon and the furnishings of the Vachel Lindsay Reading Room.

A newer, more modern building was erected with a main reading room on the lower floor and a browsing room above.  The card catalog was saved from fire damage and much of the lost book collection was replaced.  The west end of the browsing room was designated the Vachel Lindsay Room, and the east end as the Adelaide Robbins Rhodes Room.  In 1962 this area was converted into the Geidlinger Music Room.

In 1948 a further addition to the south side of the Library was built, again with funds from the Teachout Foundation.  Finally, a fourth addition was necessary by 1963.  This expanded the building westward toward Dean Street and effectively doubled the size of the Library once again.  Included were rooms for the newly planned Archives and Special Collections.  It was made possible by a substantial gift from Mr. and Mrs. Harley C. Price, and the Library was renamed the Teachout-Price Memorial Library. During the 1970s the Library came to share space with newer services, the Media Center and the Dray Computer Center, both on the lower level of the building.  The Media Center became administratively incorporated into the Library.

By the late 1980s the continued growth of the collection, the demand for more study space, and the need to incorporate new technologies led to the decision to plan for a new building.  A comprehensive capital campaign by the college featured the construction of a $7.1 million facility as its centerpiece.  Funding came from hundreds of contributors and friends, prominently the Kresge Foundation, however no single donor contributed enough to confer a name to the building, and so it remains the Hiram College Library.  Completed in 1995, the collections, equipment, and some of the furnishings of the Library were relocated in the new building that summer.  Features of the new building included space for a video studio, a redesigned Archives and Special Collections, a Library Instruction Room, group study rooms, and a multi-functional space, the Pritchard Room.

Shortly thereafter, the Library provided access to its new online catalog, and two years later joined the OhioLINK Consortium.  Among the more prominent changes since 1995 include:
The movement of the music collections out of the Chamberlain Room, and its replacement by the Children's Literature and Curriculum Materials Collections.
Wholesale movement of collections to make room for a new reading area and music recording collections.

Notes

Hiram College
Libraries in Ohio
University and college academic libraries in the United States
Buildings and structures in Portage County, Ohio
Library buildings completed in 1900
Library buildings completed in 1995